The William Faulkner Foundation (1960-1970) was a charitable organization founded by the novelist William Faulkner in 1960 to support various charitable causes, all educational or literary in nature.

The foundation

The foundation programs included the William Faulkner Foundation Award for notable first novel; the Ibero-American Award; a scholarship for first-year University of Virginia undergraduates showing talent in creative writing; scholarships for African-Americans from Mississippi seeking higher education; and monetary gifts to a Boy Scouts of America "Negro summer camp" in Mississippi.

The fund's assets derived primarily from Faulkner's Nobel Prize for Literature, and in later years, an "Associates" group contributed further funds.  Faulkner also donated to the foundation, over several stages, all of the manuscripts that he had placed on deposit for safekeeping at the University of Virginia library. In 1968, Harold Ober Associates donated to the foundation "certain original records of William Faulkner."

Founding members of the foundation included William Faulkner, Linton R. Massey Jr., Faulkner's daughter Jill Faulkner Summers and her husband, Paul Summers Jr. After Faulkner's death in 1962, his widow Estelle Faulkner joined the foundation.

The foundation was dissolved in 1970 and all its assets conveyed to the University of Virginia because of a failure of will on the part of the university, which tired of the obligation to award the prizes, and sued in order to divert the assets of the foundation to the university library.

Scholarships

Writing awards
This is about the William Faulkner Award, not the William Faulkner Prize or PEN/Faulkner Award for Fiction
The original intent of the foundation's two literary awards was to support young writers. The William Faulkner Foundation Award for notable first novel was judged by young faculty at the University of Virginia because "Faulkner felt that young persons can best understand and judge young writers.".

The other award, The Ibero-American award, was inspired by Faulkner's visit to Venezuela in 1961, which he had made as part of a cultural diplomacy effort to improve U.S.-Venezuelan relations. Faulkner realized on the trip how many excellent novels by young Latin American writers were not translated into English and wanted the award to ameliorate the situation. The award was originally intended to support young writers, but the eligibility age was abolished soon after the project was undertaken; the only requirement was that the novel had to have been published after World War II. It was judged by individuals from across Latin America, and the winning novel was to be translated into English at Foundation expense.

Winners of William Faulkner Foundation Award for Notable First Novel
The date shown is the year the award was made, for a book published the year prior.
1961 John Knowles, A Separate Peace
1962 Lawrence Sargent Hall, Stowaway 
1963 Reynolds Price, A Long and Happy Life
1964 Thomas Pynchon, V. 
1965 Charles Simmons, Powdered Eggs
1966 Cormac McCarthy, The Orchard Keeper 
1967 Robert Coover, The Origin of the Brunists
1968 Frederick Exley, A Fan's Notes
1969 Robert Stone, A Hall of Mirrors
1970 Larry Woiwode, What I'm Going to Do, I Think

Winners of Ibero-American Award
1962
Los enemigos del alma by Eduardo Mallea, Argentina
Los deshabitados by Marcelo Quiroga Santa Cruz, Bolivia
Vidas Sêcas by Graciliano Ramos, Brazil
Coronación by José Donoso, Chile
Marcos Ramírez by Carlos Luis Fallas Sibaja, Costa Rica 
El Buen Ladrón by Marcio Veloz Maggiolo, Dominican Republic
El Señor Presidente by Miguel Angel Asturias, Guatemala
Los Forzados de Gamboa by Joaquín Beleño, Panama
Hijo de hombre by Roa Bastos, Paraguay
Los ríos profundos by José María Arguedas, Peru
La vispera del hombre by René Marqués, Puerto Rico
El astillero by Juan Carlos Onetti, Uruguay
Érase un hombre pentafácico by Emma Godoy, Mexico
Cumboto by Ramón Díaz Sánchez, Venezuela. This novel was selected for translation into English. The translation by John Upton was published by the University of Texas Press, 1969.

References

External links
Corporate records of the William Faulkner Foundation at the Albert and Shirley Small Special Collections Library at the University of Virginia
Papers of Linton Massey relating to the William Faulkner Collection and the William Faulkner Foundation at the Albert and Shirley Small Special Collections Library at the University of Virginia
Papers Concerning the Ibero-American Project, 1961-1973 at the Albert and Shirley Small Special Collections Library at the University of Virginia

American fiction awards
First book awards
Awards established in 1960
Awards disestablished in 1970
1960 establishments in Virginia
1970 disestablishments in Virginia